High Maintenance is a television and web series created by Katja Blichfeld and Ben Sinclair, which premiered its first season online on Vimeo on November 9, 2012. 19 webisodes of High Maintenance have been released. These episodes have since migrated from Vimeo to HBO under the title “High Maintenance Web Series”.

In 2016, High Maintenance moved to HBO.  High Maintenances nine-episode fourth season premiered on February 7, 2020.

Series overview

Web series

Television series

Web series episodes

Cycle 1 (2012)

Cycle 2 (2013)

Cycle 3 (2013)

Cycle 4 (2013–14)

Cycle 5 (2014)

Cycle 6 (2015)

Television series episodes

Season 1 (2016)

Season 2 (2018)

Season 3 (2019)

Season 4 (2020)

References

External links
 

High Maintenance